Lake Victoria is a lake in Douglas County, in the U.S. state of Minnesota.

Lake Victoria was named after Queen Victoria of the United Kingdom.

See also
List of lakes in Minnesota

References

Lakes of Minnesota
Lakes of Douglas County, Minnesota